The 2008 Honghe Industrial China Open was a professional ranking snooker tournament that took place between 24 and 30 March 2008 at the Beijing University Students' Gymnasium in Beijing, China. This was the penultimate ranking event of the 2007–08 season, preceding the 2008 World Snooker Championship.

The defending champion was Graeme Dott, but he lost in the first round against Barry Pinches.

Shaun Murphy and Dave Harold set two new records in the eight  of their first round match. Murphy eventually won it after 93 minutes and 12 seconds, beating the record of the longest televised frame between Mark Selby and Marco Fu at the 2007 UK Championship and the longest frame in professional competition between Cliff Thorburn and Stephen O'Connor at the 1994 Welsh Open qualifiers, which took 77 minutes 31 seconds and 92 minutes 52 seconds respectively.

Stephen Maguire made the first maximum break in an Asian ranking tournament in the second frame of his semi-final encounter against Ryan Day.

Maguire won his fourth ranking title by defeating Murphy 10–9 in a high-quality final.

Prize fund
The breakdown of prize money for this year is shown below:

Winner: £48,000
Runner-up: £22,500
Semi-final: £12,000
Quarter-final: £6,500
Last 16: £4,275
Last 32: £2,750
Last 48: £1,725
Last 64: £1,325

Stage one highest break: £500
Stage two highest break: £2,000
Stage one maximum break: £1,000
Stage two maximum break: £20,000
Total: £250,000

Wildcard round

Main draw

Final

Qualifying
Qualifying for the tournament took place at Pontins in Prestatyn, Wales between 22 and 25 January 2008.

Century breaks

Qualifying stage centuries

144  Munraj Pal
138  Andrew Higginson
134  Jamie Cope
131  James McBain
130, 104, 101  Liu Chuang
128  Mike Dunn
128  Mark Allen
125  Jimmy Michie
120  Barry Pinches
119  Jamie O'Neill
119  Anthony Hamilton
114, 113  Liu Song

113  David Roe
112  David Morris
110  Michael Holt
104  Leo Fernandez
104  Stuart Pettman
104  Dave Harold
103, 103, 102  Matthew Selt
101, 101  Marco Fu
100  Michael Judge
100 Lee Spick
100  Fergal O'Brien
100  Ian McCulloch

Televised stage centuries

147, 137, 126, 106, 105, 102  Stephen Maguire
140, 136  Ken Doherty
136, 112, 111  Shaun Murphy
135, 118  Mark Allen
132, 127, 117, 109, 106  Mark Selby
128  Fergal O'Brien
127, 116  John Higgins
127, 116  Barry Pinches
123, 104  Ryan Day

121, 114, 105  Marco Fu
115  Jin Long
112  Neil Robertson
110, 108, 101  Mark Williams
110, 106  Marcus Campbell
107, 104  Ricky Walden
104, 101, 100  Nigel Bond
102  Barry Hawkins

References

2008
China Open (Snooker)
China Open
Sports competitions in Beijing